Edward "Corky" Cornelius (December 3, 1914 – August 3, 1943) was an American jazz trumpeter.

Cornelius's father was a drummer who worked regionally in dance bands in Texas. He was born in Indiana and raised in Binghamton, New York, and began his career in the early 1930s, playing with Les Brown, Buddy Rogers, and Frank Dailey. He joined Benny Goodman's band early in 1939, and went with Gene Krupa when the drummer split off to form his own group.

While there, Cornelius met singer Irene Daye, whom he married soon after. He played with the Casa Loma Orchestra from 1941 until 1943, when he died suddenly of kidney failure. His widow, Daye, married Charlie Spivak, in 1950.

General references
Eugene Chadbourne, [ Corky Cornelius] at Allmusic

1914 births
1943 deaths
American jazz trumpeters
American male trumpeters
Musicians from Indiana
20th-century American musicians
20th-century trumpeters
20th-century American male musicians
American male jazz musicians
Deaths from kidney failure
People from Binghamton, New York